Jean Bedford (born 4 February 1946) is an English-born Australian writer who is best known for her crime fiction, but who has also written novels and short stories, as well as nonfiction. She is also an editor and journalist, and has taught creative writing in several universities for over 20 years.

Life
Bedford was born in Cambridge, England and came to Australia as an infant. She grew up in country Victoria on the Mornington Peninsula. She undertook her Bachelor of Arts degree at Monash University and then studied Teaching English as a Second Language at the University of Papua New Guinea where she had gone with her first husband, Klim Gollan. They had a daughter, Sofya Gollan, who is a deaf actress.

After the failure of her first marriage, she returned to Australia and worked at the Canberra College of Advanced Education. She later met writer Peter Corris, with whom she had two more daughters, Miriam and Ruth.  They separated, and she married Rod Parker, who had a daughter, Abi, from a previous relationship. Parker died in 1988. Then she and Peter Corris reignited their relationship, and finally married in 1991.

Bedford and Corris lived in the Illawarra region on the south coast of New South Wales. She includes Australian writers Gabrielle Lord and Helen Garner among her friends.

Bedford has had a varied career. In addition to writing, she has worked as a teacher, journalist, editor and publisher, and has lectured in creative writing at several universities.  Her literary career has included being literary editor for The National Times and a literary consultant for the Australian Film Commission. In 2012 she and Linda Funnell established the Newtown Review of Books, an independent website for book reviews.

Writing career
Bedford says that she first started to think of writing seriously when she worked at the Canberra College of Advanced Education. Her first writings, short stories, were published in the Nation Review. Her first book was Country Girl Again, published by Sisters in 1979.

Her first novel, Sister Kate, explores the Ned Kelly legend from the point of view of Ned's sister, Kate. Bedford says she was inspired to write it after reading the American novel Desperadoes which she felt dealt with national myth in a way that Australian writers didn't. The book was well received and regularly appears on school syllabi in Australia. By the time it was published she was at Stanford University on the Australian Stanford Writers Fellowship.

Her second novel Love Child, published in 1986, explores, she says, "the difference between a romantic passion and real love that has to involve real generosity and a real understanding of what the other person is, and what they want".

Bedford includes Patrick White and D. H. Lawrence as her early literary influences, and also admires Frank Moorhouse.

She has published ten books of fiction, including three detective novels and a thriller. She has also edited several collections of fiction and non-fiction. Her short stories have appeared in many literary magazines and anthologies.

Bedford has been a judge for many awards, including The Australian/Vogel Literary Award.

Themes and subject matter
In an interview with Jennifer Ellison, Bedford said that "You want to do more than just tell a story. You want to tell the truth, and the way you see the truth is very political, always. I hope that my politics come out in what I choose to write about." Bedford's truth often relates to the lives of women, and the ways in which they can be trapped. She was part of a new wave of contemporary women writers in the 1980s who, with the support of both independent and mainstream publishing houses like McPhee Gribble and Penguin Books, "experimented with narrative form to find ways to tell women's stories".

Her collection of short stories, Country Girl, Again "paints a bleak, unillusioned picture of rural life and its stifling or destructive effects on the lives of women". Similarly, Colouring In, a collaborative work, also explores women's lives, this time looking at "the pleasures and pressures of urban life".

Bedford's crime and historical novels too focus on women and their experience. Sister Kate, her novel imagining the life of Ned Kelly' sister, provides a feminist perspective on a legend which until then had been almost totally expressed in terms of male mythology, and If With a Beating Heart is about "the turbulent life" of Claire Claremont, who was stepsister to Mary Shelley and lover to Lord Byron.

Works
Country Girl Again (1979, collection of short stories)
Sister Kate (1982)
Love Child (1986)
Colouring In (1986, collection of short stories with Rosemary Cresswell)
To Make a Killing (1990, Anna Southwood Mystery series)
Worse than Death (1992, Anna Southwood Mystery series, with Tom Kelly)
Signs of Murder (1993, Anna Southwood Mystery series)
If with a Beating Heart (1993)
Moonlight Becomes You (1996)
Crime and Tide (1998, Brisbane River Mysteries)

References

Australian women novelists
20th-century Australian novelists
Australian feminist writers
Australian women journalists
Australian journalists
Australian crime writers
1946 births
Living people
20th-century Australian women writers
Australian women short story writers
Women mystery writers
People from Cambridge
Writers from Victoria (Australia)
English emigrants to Australia
Monash University alumni
University of Papua New Guinea alumni
20th-century Australian short story writers